The Tyne–Tees derby is a term used by some for a football match between Newcastle United and Middlesbrough. There is a distance of 42 miles between both teams.

The fixture had increased importance in the late 1990s and early 2000s, as the only all North-East fixture of the season, since at the time Newcastle United and Middlesbrough were Premier League teams (while Sunderland was largely outside the top flight at the time). Both teams enjoyed a degree of success in this period: Newcastle qualified in for the Champions League and challenged for the Premier League title. Middlesbrough, with high-profile players including Juninho, Fabrizio Ravanelli,  Jimmy Floyd Hasselbaink and Mark Viduka, reached five major cup finals from 1997 to 2006, including the 2006 UEFA Cup Final and lifted the 2004 League Cup.

Middlesbrough play their home games at the Riverside Stadium, while Newcastle United play their home games at St. James' Park.

Results 

The following table shows results from matches between Newcastle and Middlesbrough since 1988.

See also
Tyne-Wear derby
Tees-Wear derby

References

 

England football derbies
Newcastle United F.C.
Middlesbrough F.C.